Friday the Thirteenth is a 1933 British drama film directed by Victor Saville and starring Jessie Matthews, Sonnie Hale and Muriel Aked.

Plot
The film depicts the lives of several passengers in the hours before they are involved in a bus crash.

Cast

 Jessie Matthews as Millie
 Sonnie Hale as Alf the Conductor
 Muriel Aked as Miss Twigg
 Cyril Smith - Fred the Driver
 Richard Hulton as Johnny
 Max Miller as Joe
 Alfred Drayton as The Detective
 Hartley Power as American tourist
 Percy Parsons as American tourist
 Ursula Jeans as Eileen Jackson
 Eliot Makeham as Henry Jackson
 D. A. Clarke-Smith as Max
 Gibb McLaughlin as Florist
 Edmund Gwenn as  Mr Wakefield
 Mary Jerrold as Flora Wakefield
 Gordon Harker as Hamilton Briggs
 Emlyn Williams as William Blake
 Frank Lawton as Frank Parsons
 Belle Chrystall as Marry Summers
 O. B. Clarence as Clerk
 Robertson Hare as Ralph Lightfoot
 Martita Hunt as Agnes Lightfoot
 Leonora Corbett as Dolly
 Ralph Richardson as Horace Dawes
 Donald Calthrop as Hugh Nicholls
 Ivor McLaren as Dancing instructor
 Winifred Poole as Martha
 Wally Patch as Bookmaker

Critical reception
AllMovie wrote, "Extraordinarily well cast for a mid-1930s British film, Friday the 13th affords excellent acting opportunities for the likes of Jessie Mathews, Ursula Jeans, Frank Lawton, Ralph Richardson, Max Miller, O.B. Clarence and Emlyn Williams, among many many others. While American critics were impressed by the film, British reviewers were less kind, commenting that the constant switch from one character to another only results in confusion (PS: It doesn't)."

Home media
On 6 April 2015, Friday the Thirteenth was released on DVD as part of Volume 1 of The Jesse Matthews Revue.

References

External links
 
 

1933 films
1933 drama films
British drama films
Films directed by Victor Saville
Films produced by Michael Balcon
Gainsborough Pictures films
British black-and-white films
Films set in London
1930s English-language films
1930s British films